The United Kingdom local elections of 2004 were held on 10 June, as part of the 2004 set of elections along with the European elections and the London mayoral and Assembly elections.

The councils of all the metropolitan boroughs in England and all the principal areas of Wales were all up for re-election, along with many other district and unitary authorities throughout England. No local elections were held in Scotland.

Overall
These were the first elections since Michael Howard became leader of the Conservative Party. Howard was looking for a good result in the election to confirm that the Conservatives were back on the road to being able to seriously consider winning the next general election.

Early results confirmed that the Labour Party was having a bad time. Deputy Prime Minister John Prescott said that, "Iraq was a cloud, or indeed a shadow, over these elections. I am not saying we haven't had a kicking. It's not a great day for Labour".

However the Conservatives were not making many of the gains that would have indicated a complete change of electoral fortune. The national equivalent share of the vote in the election was found by academics Colin Rallings and Michael Thrasher to be 37% to the Conservatives, 27% to the Liberal Democrats and 26% to Labour. For one of the two major parties to come third in local elections was unheard of in the post-1945 period, let alone for a governing party with such a large majority to come third.

Even in the North, Labour's traditional heartland, Labour did not do too well, losing control of Doncaster, Leeds, Newcastle and St Helens.  However, they did pick up several councils, notably Caerphilly and Rhondda Cynon Taff from Plaid Cymru in Wales.

Despite an increase in their vote and number of councillors, the Liberal Democrats saw a net loss of councils to NOC. The loss to the Conservatives of Eastbourne was in a single-seat by-election. This was partially offset by victories in Newcastle upon Tyne and Pendle.

The British National Party made a net gain of four seats, and held 14. This left them with a total 21 councillors in the country, including six in Burnley and four in Bradford. In the wards they contested, they averaged 16.1% of the vote.

It was to prove a false dawn for the Conservatives; when Britain went to the polls for the following year's general election, Labour was re-elected, although its majority was greatly reduced and the Conservatives did make gains.

Summary of results

England

Metropolitan boroughs

‡ New ward boundaries

Unitary authorities

Whole council

‡ New ward boundaries

Third of council

District councils

Whole council

‡ New ward boundaries

Half of council

Third of council

Mayoral elections

Wales

References

Local elections 2006. House of Commons Library Research Paper 06/26.

 
2004
Local elections